Joe Young (born Joe Lefeged, June 2, 1988) is a former American football safety. Young is better known by his former surname Lefeged.

Early life
Young was born Joe Lefeged in Durham, North Carolina and raised in Gaithersburg, Maryland. He attended The Bullis School in Potomac, Maryland and then Northwest High School in Germantown, Maryland and was the Washington Post All-Met Defensive Player of the Year.

Lefeged played college football at Rutgers.

Professional career

Indianapolis Colts
Young was signed by the Indianapolis Colts as an undrafted free agent on July 29, 2011.

Young started four games in the 2012 season.

On June 29, 2013, Young was arrested in Washington, D.C., after fleeing police during a traffic stop, on five charges; carrying a firearm without a license, having an unregistered firearm, having unregistered ammunition, presence of a firearm in a motor vehicle and possession of an open container of alcohol.

Jacksonville Jaguars
On January 15, 2014, Young signed with the Jacksonville Jaguars. He was released on August 24.

References

External links
 Indianapolis Colts bio
 Jacksonville Jaguars bio

1988 births
Living people
Sportspeople from Durham, North Carolina
American football safeties
Rutgers Scarlet Knights football players
Indianapolis Colts players
Jacksonville Jaguars players
People from Gaithersburg, Maryland